Pelican Bay is a city in Tarrant County, Texas, United States. The population was 1,547 at the 2010 census.

Geography

Pelican Bay is located at  (32.919895, –97.518739).

According to the United States Census Bureau, the city has a total area of 0.6 square miles (1.7 km2), all of it land. The community is located near Eagle Mountain Lake, and it got its name from Pelican Island in the lake.

Demographics

As of the census of 2000, there were 1,505 people, 523 households, and 389 families residing in the city. The population density was 2,307.5 people per square mile (894.0/km2). There were 574 housing units at an average density of 880.1/sq mi (341.0/km2). The racial makeup of the city was 93.62% White, 0.73% African American, 0.66% Native American, 0.20% Asian, 0.20% Pacific Islander, 2.52% from other races, and 2.06% from two or more races. Hispanic or Latino of any race were 8.84% of the population.

There were 523 households, out of which 43.4% had children under the age of 18 living with them, 55.6% were married couples living together, 12.6% had a female householder with no husband present, and 25.6% were non-families. 19.5% of all households were made up of individuals, and 6.1% had someone living alone who was 65 years of age or older. The average household size was 2.88 and the average family size was 3.28.

In the city, the population was spread out, with 33.5% under the age of 18, 10.2% from 18 to 24, 32.1% from 25 to 44, 17.5% from 45 to 64, and 6.6% who were 65 years of age or older. The median age was 29 years. For every 100 females, there were 106.4 males. For every 100 females age 18 and over, there were 102.2 males.

The median income for a household in the city was $30,435, and the median income for a family was $32,656. Males had a median income of $29,500 versus $19,286 for females. The per capita income for the city was $12,408. About 13.6% of families and 15.3% of the population were below the poverty line, including 21.8% of those under age 18 and 7.5% of those age 65 or over.

Education
The City of Pelican Bay is served by the Azle Independent School District.

References

External links
 City of Pelican Bay, Texas website
 History of Pelican Bay, Texas
 Pelican Bay Police Department

Dallas–Fort Worth metroplex
Cities in Tarrant County, Texas
Cities in Texas